Paul Richardson Jr. (born April 13, 1992) is a former American football wide receiver. He played college football at Colorado and was drafted by the Seattle Seahawks in the second round of the 2014 NFL Draft. He has also played for the Washington Redskins.

Early years
Richardson attended Junípero Serra High School in Gardena, California and Los Alamitos High School in Los Alamitos, California. During his high school career, he had 110 receptions for 1,948 yards and 28 touchdowns. He was also a letterman in basketball and track. In track, he had career-bests of 10.62 in the 100 meters, 21 seconds in the 200 meters and 40.66 seconds in the 4x100.

College career
Richardson originally attended UCLA, but was dismissed from the team prior to his freshman season after being placed under arrest for felony theft of a purse, along with his cousin Shaquille Richardson and another teammate, Josh Shirley. He then attended the University of Colorado Boulder. He played in all 12 games that year, recording 34 receptions for 514 yards and six touchdowns. As a sophomore in 2011, he played in nine games recording 39 receptions for 555 yards and five touchdowns. He missed four games due to injury. In April 2012, he tore his ACL which caused him to miss the season. He returned as a starter in 2013. During the season, he set the school record for receiving yards in a season of 1,343 yards. At the end of the season, Richardson announced his intent to declare for the 2014 NFL Draft.

Collegiate statistics

Professional career

Seattle Seahawks

Richardson was selected by the Seattle Seahawks in the second round (45th overall) in the 2014 NFL Draft. He made his NFL debut in the season opener against the Green Bay Packers but was not targeted. In Week 3 against the Denver Broncos, Richardson caught his first career NFL reception, which was for seven yards. In Week 13, he caught what would have been his first NFL touchdown, but it was called back due to a penalty. During Week 15, he caught his first NFL touchdown against the San Francisco 49ers. Richardson finished with 29 receptions, 271 yards, and a touchdown in his rookie season. In Seattle's opening divisional playoff matchup against the Carolina Panthers, after only having one reception for 21 yards, he went down in the third quarter with what was first believed to be a sprained knee at the time, was later revealed to be a torn ACL upon further inspection. He was then placed on the Injured reserve, ending his 2014-15 rookie campaign. On December 5, 2015, after making a 40-yard catch, Richardson hurt his hamstring and was subsequently placed on injured reserve.

Richardson had a relatively quiet season again in 2016, until starting wide receiver Tyler Lockett suffered a season-ending injury in Week 16. In the Wild Card round of the playoffs against the Detroit Lions, he recorded three catches for 48 yards, including a one-handed touchdown catch on 4th and goal.

In 2017, Richardson would have his best season to date with career highs with receptions (44), receiving yards (703), and touchdowns (6).

Washington Redskins

Richardson signed a five-year, $40 million contract with the Washington Redskins on March 15, 2018. On September 9, 2018, Richardson made his Redskins debut, catching four passes for 22 yards in the season-opening win against the Arizona Cardinals. On September 16, Richardson recorded a season-high 63 yards on four receptions against the Indianapolis Colts. The following week, he recorded his first touchdown as a Redskin, scoring on a 46-yard reception against the Green Bay Packers. On October 14, in Week 6, Richardson caught three passes for 31 yards and a touchdown against the Carolina Panthers, his second touchdown of the season. On November 5, he was placed on injured reserve with a shoulder injury.

In Week 3 of the 2019 season against the Chicago Bears, Richardson caught eight passes for 83 yards and a touchdown. He was placed on injured reserve on December 14, 2019, after struggling with a nagging hamstring injury for several weeks.

On February 14, 2020, Richardson was released by the Redskins.

Seattle Seahawks (second stint)
Richardson re-signed with the Seattle Seahawks on August 29, 2020. On September 5, 2020, Richardson was released from the Seahawks.

NFL career statistics

References

External links
Seattle Seahawks bio
Colorado Buffaloes bio

1992 births
American football wide receivers
Colorado Buffaloes football players
Living people
Players of American football from Los Angeles
Seattle Seahawks players
Washington Redskins players
Junípero Serra High School (Gardena, California) alumni